B81 may refer to :
 Sicilian Defence, Scheveningen Variation, Encyclopaedia of Chess Openings code
 HLA-B81, an HLA-B serotype
 Bundesstraße 81, a road in Germany
 Rolls-Royce B81 Engine, a straight-eight petrol engine primarily used in the Alvis Stalwart and FV430 Series Mk 1 vehicles